Ray Holley (born June 14, 1990) is a gridiron football running back who is currently a free agent. He formerly attended Louisiana Tech University where he played college football for the Louisiana Tech Bulldogs.

Early career 
Holley played high school football at El Modena High School before attending Orange Coast College for two years. In 2009, he recorded 311 carries for a school-best 1,457 rushing yards. He transferred to Louisiana Tech to play for the Bulldogs in 2010, where he played until 2012. Holley missed games during 2011 due to a season-ending back injury. In his final year with the Bulldogs, he ran for 1,090 yards and 13 touchdowns.

Professional career 
Holley was eligible for the 2013 NFL Draft and participated in Louisiana Tech's Pro Day that year. Holley initially drew interest from multiple teams, including tryouts from the New England Patriots and the Dallas Cowboys, but went undrafted. He was eventually signed by the Baltimore Ravens as a free agent shortly after the draft. He was later released and joined the Seattle Seahawks for a short period of time prior to the start of the regular season.

Holley worked part-time installing air conditioners until April 2015, but attended the Hamilton Tiger-Cats free agent camp that month. He signed with the Tiger-Cats in late May. Due to injuries to Mossis Madu and C. J. Gable, Holley became the starting running back for the Tiger-Cats in June. He made his CFL debut starting in the season opener against the Calgary Stampeders on June 26, 2015, where he rushed for 24 yards on 8 carries.

References

External links 
Hamilton Tiger-Cats bio  

1990 births
Living people
American football running backs
American players of Canadian football
Baltimore Ravens players
Canadian football running backs
Hamilton Tiger-Cats players
Louisiana Tech Bulldogs football players
Orange Coast College alumni
Players of American football from California
Seattle Seahawks players
Sportspeople from Orange, California